Eduardo Lecke Kunde (born 17 September 1997) is a Brazilian footballer who plays as a central defender for SC Sagamihara.

Club career
Kunde was born in Montenegro, Rio Grande do Sul, and represented Avaí as a youth. Promoted to the first team in the latter stages of the 2018 campaign, he remained unused as his side achieved promotion to the Série A.

Kunde made his first team debut on 23 January 2019, starting in a 3–0 Campeonato Catarinense home defeat of Hercílio Luz. He contributed with 11 appearances in the state tournament, as his side was crowned champions.

Kunde made league debut on 1 May 2019, starting in a 1–1 home draw against Grêmio.

Honours
Avaí
Campeonato Catarinense: 2019

References

External links
 

1997 births
Living people
Sportspeople from Rio Grande do Sul
Brazilian footballers
Brazilian people of German descent
Association football defenders
Campeonato Brasileiro Série A players
Campeonato Brasileiro Série B players
Avaí FC players
Cuiabá Esporte Clube players
SC Sagamihara players
J2 League players